Abnormipterus is a monotypic moth genus in the erebid subfamily Arctiinae described by Orfila in 1935. Its single species, Abnormipterus abnormis, was first described by George Hampson in 1898. It is found in the lower Amazon River basin.

References

Arctiinae
Monotypic moth genera
Moths of South America